Actagardin (INN; also known as gardimycin) is a tetracyclic peptide lantibiotic made by Actinoplanes brasiliensis. It was discovered in 1975 by Lepetit S.p.A. Its method of antibiotic activity involves the inhibition of peptidoglycan, preferentially targeting gram negative bacteria.

References 

Lantibiotics
Peptides